Martina Hingis and Flavia Pennetta won the first edition of the tournament by defeating Cara Black and Caroline Garcia 6–4, 5–7, [12–10] in the final.

Seeds

Draw

Finals

Top half

Bottom half

References 
 Draw

Doubles